Pavlov is a municipality and village in Kladno District in the Central Bohemian Region of the Czech Republic. It has about 200 inhabitants.

Geography
It lies in a flat agricultural landscape of the Prague Plateau.

History
The first written mention of Pavlov is from 1519, when there was a farm owned by the Saint Vitus Chapter in Hostouň. In 1726, the then-owner Ferdinand Kustod of Zubří and Lipka administratively connected 10 houses and a brewery from the surrounding settlements to the farm and created the Nový Dvůr manor.

After the manor changed hands several times, it was bought by Leopold Paul in 1799. He had built a manor house and a settlement next to the farm, and named it after himself Pavlov (Paulow in German).

Transport
The D6 motorway passes through the northern part of the municipality. Pavlov is also served by a railway station on the railway line from Prague to Kladno.

References

External links

Villages in Kladno District
Populated places established in 1799